Gilead J. Wilmot (April 21, 1834 – ?) was a member of the Wisconsin State Senate.

He attended Gouverneur Wesleyan Seminary in Gouverneur, New York. During the American Civil War, he was a captain with the 34th Wisconsin Volunteer Infantry Regiment of the Union Army.

Senate career
Wilmot was a member of the Senate from the 33rd District during the 1875 and 1876 sessions. He was a Democrat.

References

People from Lewis County, New York
People from Gouverneur, New York
People from Ozaukee County, Wisconsin
Democratic Party Wisconsin state senators
People of Wisconsin in the American Civil War
Union Army officers
1834 births
Year of death missing